The 1966 Saskatchewan Roughriders season was the 57th in franchise history. Following a first-place finish in the regular season, the Roughriders won their first Grey Cup over the Ottawa Rough Riders. It was Saskatchewan's first championship in franchise history.

Preseason

Regular season

Season Standings

Schedule

 † denotes that the week, date and score of this game is unknown.

Postseason

Schedule

Grey Cup

Awards and honours
Grey Cup's Most Valuable Player, George Reed
George Reed, CFL All-Star, Offense
Hugh Campbell, CFL All-Star, Offense

References

External links
 Saskatchewan Roughriders Official Site
 Regina Leader-Post
 RiderFans.com
 RiderPrider.com
 RiderBlitz.com: Rider blog

Saskatchewan Roughriders seasons
N. J. Taylor Trophy championship seasons
Grey Cup championship seasons
1966 Canadian Football League season by team